Medina Township may refer to the following places in the United States:

 Medina Township, Peoria County, Illinois
 Medina Township, Warren County, Indiana
 Medina Township, Michigan
 Medina Township, Medina County, Ohio

Township name disambiguation pages